Phalke  was a Maratha clan among 96 clans of the maratha community of Maharashtra and states bordering to it.

See also
 Maratha
 Maratha Empire
 Maratha clan system
 List of Maratha dynasties and states
 Bhonsle
 Gaekwad
 Scindia
 Puars
 Holkar

References

Maratha clans